The Ahwatukee Foothills News is a weekly newspaper that serves the Ahwatukee district of the city of Phoenix. Its education and sports coverage mainly revolves around the two high schools serving the district: Mountain Pointe High School and Desert Vista High School (both part of the Tempe Union High School District).

The paper is delivered every Wednesday and boasts a circulation of 28,000. Locals may also refer to it as the AFN.

History 
First published as the Ahwatukee Sentinel in 1976, the name was changed to the Ahwatukee News in 1978.

In 1988 it once again changed its name, this time to the Ahwatukee Weekly News. The current incarnation is the Ahwatukee Foothills News.

In November 1998, Ahwatukee Foothills News joined Thompson Newspapers, which already owned the East Valley Tribune, as part of the Phoenix SMG (Strategic Marketing Group).

Then, in December 2000, Thomson Newspapers sold its Arizona newspaper holdings to Freedom Communications, Inc. of Irvine, California.

Freedom Communications filed for Chapter 11 reorganization on September 1, 2009, in federal bankruptcy court in Delaware. In 2010, Freedom Communications sold the East Valley Tribune, the Daily News-Sun, the Ahwatukee Foothills News, Glendale/Peoria Today and Surprise Today to 10/13 Communications.

In late January 2016, Scottsdale-based Times Media Group acquired the East Valley Tribune and Ahwatukee Foothills News from 10/13 Communications and immediately assumed day-to-day operations.

Awards
The paper as a whole took home five awards from the 2008 Arizona Newspapers Association Better Newspapers contest. Being judged in Division 3 (Non-Daily circulation greater than 10,000), the AFN took home first place for Departmental News & Copywriting Excellence, and four third-place awards: General Excellence; Best Use of Photography; Community Service/Journalistic Achievement; and Special Section, Newspaper Supplement or Magazine.

Individually, there was one winner: Former sports reporter Ryan Casey won three awards: Best Team, Sport or Sports Beat Coverage (1st place, Desert Vista); Best Sports Story (2nd place, Desert Vista football); and Best Lifestyle Feature Story (3rd place, "A Long Road Back").

(Note: Its sister paper, the Maricopa Tribune also had an individual winner, Brett Fera, in Best Sports Story (1st place) in the Non-Daily circulation under 3,500 category.)

Five current and former staffers won awards at the 2007 Arizona Press Club banquet: Brant Clinard, a photographer, won seven awards, including two first places; Jason Ludwig took home first- and third-place awards for reporting; U. Frank Williams, the former photo editor, took home a second place award; Brett Fera, sports editor, won first place for sports reporting; and Ryan Casey, former staff writer, won second- and third-place awards for sports reporting.

External links
 Official website

References

Newspapers published in Arizona
Mass media in Phoenix, Arizona
1976 establishments in Arizona